Barun Sobti (born 21 August 1984) is an Indian actor, known for his roles in television series Iss Pyaar Ko Kya Naam Doon (2011–2012) and Asur (2020–present).

He started his acting career in 2009 with Star Plus show Shraddha and later appeared in a negative role in Dill Mill Gayye. He portrayed his first lead role in Sony Entertainment Television's Baat Hamari Pakki Hai (2010). In 2011, Sobti rose to fame by playing Arnav Singh Raizada in Iss Pyaar Ko Kya Naam Doon. He made his film debut with the  romantic comedy Main Aur Mr. Riight (2014) and then went onto appear in films like Tu Hai Mera Sunday (2017), 22 Yards (2019), Halahal (2020) and 200 Halla Ho (2021).

He also starred in the Disney+ Hotstar series Tanhaiyan (2017) and ALT Balaji series The Great Indian Dysfunctional Family (2018). He also narrated the audiobook "The Last Boy to fall in Love" by Durjoy Datta for Audible.

Early life
Sobti was born on 21 August 1984 to Raj Sobti and Veenu Sobti in Delhi, India. He attended St. Mark's School in Paschim Vihar, New Delhi. He worked as an operations manager at Jindal Telecom for 7 years before entering the entertainment industry.

Career

Television
Sobti made his acting debut as a lead in 2009 as Swayam Khurana in Star Plus's Shraddha. He later did negative cameo role in the famous medical show Dill Mill Gayye as Dr. Raj, a medical intern with drug addiction.

From 2010 to 2011, Sobti starred as the carefree, rich, spoiled Shravan Jaiswal in Sony TV's Baat Hamari Pakki Hai.

In 2011, Sobti gained recognition by playing Arnav Singh Raizada, a business tycoon in Star Plus's show Iss Pyaar Ko Kya Naam Doon? opposite Sanaya Irani. It was one of the top watched show of that time. In 2012, the show got cancelled because Barun's break from the show due to health problems. The last episode was aired on 30 November 2012. 

In 2017, he portrayed Advay Singh Raizada aka Dev Kashyap in Iss Pyaar Ko Kya Naam Doon 3, third installment in the Iss Pyaar Ko Kya Naam Doom series. After airing for three months, the show ended because of poor ratings.

He then starred in Hotstar original romantic drama show  Tanhaiyan, in which he played Haider Ali Khan opposite Surbhi Jyoti. The show received lukewarm response. Alpha Girl Reviews wrote "Tanhaiyan should be watched only for Barun and Surbhi. They are the only reason to keep you engaged in this directionless romantic series.". Kunal Nirmal Kothari for Koimoi wrote "Tanhaiyan is here and it is AMAZING..!".

He later on starred in ALTBalaji's The Great Indian Dysfunctional Family in 2018 as Samar Ranaut alongside Kay Kay Menon. The show also starred Eisha Chopra, Swaroop Sampat, Shriswara and Sanaya Pithawalla in key roles. It received almost positive reviews from critics and audience. Nicole of The Quint writes "Beyond its contemporary packaging, TGIDF doesn’t reinvent the wheel. But it’s entertaining nonetheless much in a way that watching a mindless Bollywood flick is." Soumya Rao of Scroll writes "The show is frequently engaging, especially when it has a firm grip on the storyline, but loses its footing often.". SpotboyE wrote "The Great Indian Dysfunctional Family isn’t a ground-breaking show, but it does enough to keep you engaged with the life of the Ranauts.".

In 2020, he appeared in Voot original mystery crime thriller show Asur as Nikhil Nair. The show also starred Arshad Warsi, Anupriya Goenka, Ridhi Dogra, Amey Wagh and Sharib Hashmi. The show is set in the context of a modern day serial killer having religious ties. The show received generally positive reviews from critics and audience alike.

Later that year, he appeared in MX Player show The Missing Stone.

Films
Sobti made his film debut in 2014 with the Romantic comedy Main Aur Mr. Riight, opposite Shenaz Treasury. It received negative reviews from critics, although Sobti received some praise for his performance. Letty Mariam Abraham from Bollywood Life while reviewing the film said, "Without Barun, there is clearly nothing to see in the film and hence recommended only if you are a Sobti fan." Paloma Sharma from Rediff wrote, Barun Sobti fares better than his costars in the acting department.

In 2015, he acted in Dry Dreams with Kritika Kamra, a short film about water conservation. 

Sobti's second feature film was Tu Hai Mera Sunday (2016), directed by Milind Dhaimade, which premiered at festivals like BFI London Film Festival, Mumbai Film Festival and Cannes Film Festival among others. The film received positive reviews. The Indian Express praised the film, remarking, "Dhaimade is clearly skilled at creating life-like characters who feel as if they are people you could know, tics and all. ‘Tu Hai Mera Sunday’ is a feel-good, light-hearted yarn. And it comes at a time when that precious, vanishing space—middle-of-the-road and realistic, not too shiny or too drab but just right—needs an urgent refill. I guarantee you will leave smiling.". Film Companion wrote, "Starring Barun Sobti and Shahana Goswami, this film about the lack of space in Mumbai is elevated into a profound zone thanks to director Milind Dhaimade's understanding of fragile middle-class dynamics". Hindustan Times gave it 3/5 stars and reviewed, "However, Tu Hai Mera Sunday tries to talk about many issues in 126 minutes. The heated arguments sometimes look forced. The firm grips on the audience slacks somewhere in the second half. But thanks to his actors, director Milind Dhaimade manages to sail through these scenes and still conveys a very positive vibe about Tu Hai Mera Sunday.".

He also shot for a film Satra Ko Shaadi Hai, which went unreleased.

In 2019, he starred in thriller-drama short film Derma. It was premiered on Voot. Cinestaan while reviewing wrote "Barun Sobti's technically sound film falls short of the desired impact". In the same year, he also appeared in a sports drama film 22 Yards. It was directed by sports journalist turned filmmaker Mitali Ghoshal. The trailer was launched by Sourav Ganguly. Nandini Ramnath in Scroll.in writes, "Barun Sobti scores in a familiar cricketing tale of failure and redemption." News 18 gave the movie two stars out of five and wrote 'an average film that gives a simplistic insight in to the crafty world of Cricket'.

He then played the role of Inspector Yusuf Qureshi in Eros Now original movie Halahal (2020). It was written, produced by Zeishan Quadri and directed by Randeep Jha and also starred Sachin Khedekar and Manu Rishi Chadha. It received mixed to positive reviews from critics and audience. Archika Khurana of The Times of India gave the film two and a half out of five stars stating "The story is griping in the beginning but tends to get a bit draggy towards the end. However, the final nail in the coffin is its unrealistic climax." Writing in News18 Rohit Vats states "Minor flaws overlooked, Halahal is engaging for sure, and its lead talents are quite impressive. With careful project selection, the director can offer much more." The Free Press Journal gave the movie three stars out of five and Heer Kothari states "Impressive performances make this film watchable."

In the following year, he starred in Zee5 original film 200 Halla Ho. It was based on the real life incident in which 200 Dalit women lynched by Akku Yadav, a gangster, robber, serial rapist, and killer in an open court in Nagpur in 2004. It also starred Amol Palekar, Sahil Khattar, Upendra Limaye, Rinku Rajguru, Flora Saini and Indraneil Sengupta. It gained mixed reviews. Arushi Jain of The Indian Express gave the film a mixed review and stated, "Though a torpid screenplay fails the subject of the movie, veteran actor Amol Palekar stays committed to the character of a retired Dalit judge. He brings some profundity to a film that lacks depth." Archika Khurana of The Times of India gave the film 3 out of 5 stars and stated, "If you like non-fiction films based on true stories, this drama definitely deserves a watch in order to comprehend the grief and suffering that those women must have endured." Saibal Chatterjee of NDTV gave the film 3.5 out of 5 stars and stated, "Drawing strength from a slew of quietly efficient performances, the director parlays the material into an impactful tale of crime and punishment that transcends genre limitations." News 18 praised its "decent" production values, tone, pacing, "powerful" performances and "dramatic" direction.

In the same year, he appeared in a short film When A Man Loves A Woman, directed by Sai Deodhar opposite Girija Oak.

Personal life
Sobti met his wife Pashmeen Manchanda in school. After a long-distance relationship, the couple tied the knot in a private ceremony on 12 December 2010 in a Gurudwara. In 2019, the couple had a daughter, Sifat.

He was voted as the 3rd Sexiest Asian Man by UK magazine Eastern Eye following Hrithik Roshan and Shahid Kapoor. He was also ranked 2nd in the Gazette Review list of Most Handsome Men in the World in 2017-2018 as runner up to Chris Evans.

Filmography

Films

Television

Music videos

Awards and nominations

References

External links

 
 
 

1984 births
Living people
21st-century Indian male actors
Indian male television actors
Male actors in Hindi television
Indian television presenters
Male actors from Madhya Pradesh
Male actors from New Delhi
Punjabi people
People from Delhi